Haticepınar is a village of Afşin in Kahramanmaraş Province in Turkey. Haticepinar is located in Turkey inhabited by Kurdish people.

Geography

Haticepinar is 55 km away from Afşin and 205 km from Kahramanmaraş Province.

Haticepinar is located on the mountainous region of the Binboğa Mountains and for this arable lands are limited.  On the west of the village is the village of Oglakkaya, on the south is the Orenli village, on the north is the Guldede village of Gürün and on the east are the neighbouring Kavak villages.

Population

According to Government Statistics Institution there are 70 houses in the village and 1990 census shows that the population was 176, in 1997 census the population had dropped to 124. In 2009 the figure was 84.

References 

Kahramanmaraş
Kurdish settlements in Turkey
Populated places in Kahramanmaraş Province